Nightdreams is a 1981 pornographic film with strong horror elements directed by Francis Delia, and written by Jerry Stahl and Stephen Sayadian (credited respectively as "Herbert W. Day" and "Rinse Dream").

Plot 
Two scientists use electric jolts to induce a woman named Mrs. Van Houten with surreal and erotic dreams. After a set of strange scenes ranging from having sex with a man inside a Cream of Wheat box to a trip into the abyss of Hell, a surprise ending reveals who the woman receiving the jolts of electricity is.

Cast 
 Dorothy LeMay as Mrs. Van Houten
 Loni Sanders as The Demon's Slave
 Jennifer West as Doctor
 Kevin James as Heaven Man
 Fast Steppin' Freddie as Cream of Wheat
 Paul Berthell as Slice of Bread
 Ken Starbuck as The Demon
 Jacqueline Lorians as Brunette Cowgirl
 Danielle as Blonde Cowgirl
 Andy Nichols as Doctor
 Michelle Bauer as Chained Girl

Production 
Producer Stephen Sayadian said in an interview: "We did it as a series of six or seven vignettes; we just sat down and hashed out the concepts. We’ll go to Heaven, we’ll go to Hell, we’ll have one in the Wild West. It was supposed to be like an old Vaudeville review." His studio also produced one sheets and promotional posters for horror movies such as Dressed to Kill and The Funhouse and the sets used in both movies' posters were also used in filming Nightdreams.

Release

Critical reception 
The film has received generally positive reviews. It was described by Playboy magazine as “the first avant-garde adult film…Fellini meets Eraserhead,” and by Velvet magazine as “the Citizen Kane of adult films.” Adult Video News, Adam Film World and Hustler all gave it ratings of between four and five stars in their reviews. Adam Film World said, "The film is outstanding for its superb and visually exciting cinematography and extraordinarily imaginative erotic fantasies.

Pornographic film historian Jim Holliday called it "the most unusual, unique and innovative adult film yet made" and said Nightdreams "pioneered a whole new subgenre within the industry" within five years of its release due to its "raunchy gritty sexuality…combined with truly new wave sets and the Miami Vice '80s look".

Box office 
According to Sayadian "neither Nightdreams or Café Flesh were ever that successful as porn films. But they broke house records as midnight movies."

Home media 
The film was subsequently released on VHS by Caballero Home Video, which re-released it in 2006 on DVD.

Accolades and awards 
The film was voted into the XRCO Hall of Fame in 1992.

In 1986, Holliday placed it in 13th place on a list of the top 40 best adult films as selected by a consensus of industry experts. In 2001, Adult Video News placed it in 62nd place on its list of the greatest adult movies of all time. In 2007, AVN called it one of the "50 most influential adult releases of all time" for starting the alt-porn genre, which uses "MTV-inspired, rock-video schtick, hipster references and underground music."

Soundtrack 
The soundtrack includes "Ring of Fire" as covered by Wall of Voodoo as well as renditions of "Ol' Man River" and Gymnopédies.

Sequels 
Nightdreams was followed by Nightdreams II in 1989, and Nightdreams 3 in 1991. Both of these films were directed by Stephen Sayadian. The Mrs. Van Houten character also appeared in Sayadian and Stahl's 1989 effort Dr. Caligari.

See also 

 Golden Age of Porn

Notes

External links
 
 
 
 
 
 
 
 

Alt porn
1981 films
Films about dreams
1981 fantasy films
Films about sexuality
American fantasy films
1980s English-language films
1980s pornographic films
Pornographic film series
Pornographic horror films
Films with screenplays by Jerry Stahl
American pornographic films
1980s science fiction films
American science fiction films
Films shot in Los Angeles
American avant-garde and experimental films
1981 directorial debut films
1980s American films